The 21st Expeditionary Mobility Task Force (21 EMTF) was one of two EMTFs assigned to the Air Force's Air Mobility Command. It was headquartered on the McGuire Air Force Base entity of Joint Base McGuire-Dix-Lakehurst, New Jersey. The 21 EMTF was a redesignation of Twenty-First Air Force, effective 1 October 2003. The 21 EMTF reported to Headquarters, Eighteenth Air Force at Scott Air Force Base, Illinois. 

The 21 EMTF provided airlift in support of national policy under the most difficult circumstances. Created as a wing of the United States Army Air Forces during World War II, it gradually evolved into the 21st Expeditionary Mobility Task Force. Initially, it ferried aircraft, but by 1942, its mission had changed to airlifting personnel and cargo.

The 21 EMTF was inactivated on 19 March 2012.

Mission
The 21st Expeditionary Mobility Task Force (EMTF) provided a rapid, tailored, worldwide, air mobility response to combatant commander's needs. Reporting through Eighteenth Air Force, the EMTF extended existing AMC infrastructure, through both en route employment and rapid forward deployment capabilities.

Its mission was to command and assess the combat readiness of assigned air mobility forces over the Atlantic half of the globe in support of Global Reach. These forces were at more than 55 locations in eight countries. 21 EMTF's major units included six active duty wings, two operational flying groups, and two mobility operations/support groups. Additionally, the 21 EMTF was liaison to 40 Air Reserve Component Wings.

21 EMTF's strategic airlift force included the C-5 Galaxy, C-17 Globemaster III and the C-130 Hercules, aircraft, used to move cargo and passengers worldwide. The tanker force included KC-10 Extenders and KC-135 Stratotankers used for inflight refueling to provide increased global mobility.

In addition to the Task Force's airlift and refueling mission, the 89th Airlift Wing at Andrews Air Force Base, Maryland provided worldwide administrative airlift support to the President of the United States and other top government officials flying the C-20, C-21, C-32, VC-25 (Air Force One), VC-137, and UH-1 aircraft.

Units

 6th Air Refueling Wing
 MacDill Air Force Base, Florida
 19th Airlift Wing
 Little Rock Air Force Base, Arkansas
 43d Airlift Wing
 Pope Air Force Base, North Carolina
 89th Airlift Wing
 Andrews Air Force Base, Maryland
 305th Air Mobility Wing
 McGuire Air Force Base, New Jersey

 436th Airlift Wing
 Dover Air Force Base, Delaware
 437th Airlift Wing
 Charleston Air Force Base, South Carolina
 463d Airlift Group
 Little Rock Air Force Base, Arkansas
 521st Air Mobility Operations Wing
 Ramstein Air Base, Germany
 621st Contingency Response Wing
 McGuire Air Force Base, New Jersey

History

Under Military Air Transport Service, Eastern Transport Air Force (EASTAF), headquartered at McGuire AFB, New Jersey, controlled all strategic airlift operations between the Mississippi River and the east coast of Africa and in Central and South America.

When MATS became Military Airlift Command, EASTAF was redesignated Twenty-First Air Force, with the same area of responsibility. In addition to Dover AFB, other major 21st AF bases were Charleston AFB, South Carolina and McGuire AFB, NJ. Depending upon command organization at different times, airlift and airlift support units in Europe, the Azores, Bermuda and throughout the southeastern United States also reported to EASTAF or 21st AF.

In Operation Just Cause, Twenty-first Air Force units conducted the largest night airdrop since World War II, leading to the successful seizure of Panama. From August 1990, Twenty-first Air Force controlled the largest airlift in history, moving forces for Operation Desert Shield and, later, Operation Desert Storm. Later in the decade Twenty-First Air Force was involved in operations in Bosnia and repeated deployments to the Middle East directed against Iraq.

The command also supported peaceful, humanitarian missions. Twenty-first Air Force units flew relief missions after Hurricane Hugo (1989) and Andrew (1992), earthquakes in Armenia and San Francisco, and many other natural disasters. In addition, it controlled the Operation Provide Comfort airlift missions to the Kurds following the Persian Gulf War, the Operation Provide Hope airlift in the aftermath of the collapse of the Soviet Union, and participated in Operation Restore Hope, the humanitarian airlift of food and supplies into Somalia.

The ETF supported numerous exercises around the world, one of which was CENTRAZBAT, in which C-17's flew multi-national paratroopers non-stop from Pope AFB, North Carolina, airdropping them directly into the Central Asian countries of Uzbekistan and Kazakhstan demonstrating the capabilities of direct delivery. The command could operate in remote, often austere locations throughout Europe, Africa, and South America.

Lineage

 Established as 23d Army Air Forces (AAF) Ferrying Wing on 12 June 1942
 Activated on 18 June 1942
 Redesignated North Atlantic Wing on 5 July 1942
 Redesignated North Atlantic Division on 27 June 1944
 Redesignated Atlantic Division on 20 September 1945
 Redesignated Atlantic Division on 1 June 1948
 Redesignated Eastern Transport Air Force on 1 July 1958
 Redesignated Twenty-First Air Force on 3 January 1966
 Redesignated 21st Expeditionary Mobility Task Force on 1 October 2003
 Inactivated on 19 March 2012
 Redesignated Twenty-First Air Force on 30 March 2012

Assignments
 AAF Ferrying Command, 12 June 1942
 Air Transport Command, 5 July 1942
 Air Transport Service (USAF), 15 October 1947
 Military Air Transport Service, 1 June 1948
 Military Airlift Command, 1 January 1966
 Air Mobility Command, 1 June 1992

Major components
 76th Air Division
 1 March 1976 – 30 September 1977; 15 December 1980 – 1 October 1985
 322d Air Division
 3 January 1966 – 24 December 1968; 23 June 1978 – 1 April 1992
 839th Air Division
 1–31 December 1974

Stations
 Presque Isle AAF, Maine, 12 June 1942
 Fort Totten, New York, 20 September 1945
 Westover AAF (later, AFB), Massachusetts, 1 October 1947
 McGuire AFB, New Jersey, 1 June 1955

Aircraft 
C-5 Galaxy;
C-17 Globemaster III;
C-130 Hercules;
C-141 Starlifter;
KC-10 Extender;
KC-135 Stratotanker.

References

 Snedeker, Clayton H. Twenty-first Air Force: Chronology of Significant Events, 1966–present. McGuire Air Force Base, New Jersey: 21st Air Force Office of History, 1990.

External links
 Air Force Link: 21st Expeditionary Mobility Task Force fact sheet
 Air Force Historical Research Agency: Twenty-First Air Force

21
21
Transport units and formations of the United States Air Force
Military units and formations established in 2003